Meditation: Solo Guitar is a live album by jazz guitarist Joe Pass, recorded in 1992 and released posthumously in 2002.

Reception
Regarding Meditation, Jim Ferguson wrote (in JazzTimes): "In Pass' hands, no tune seemed to elude performance, and he tackled everything--from bebop numbers to waltzes to standards to Latin pieces--with astonishing ease and effectiveness, something that is amply evident throughout this set...highlights include a pensive rubato treatment of "Shadow Waltz," a slowly grooving "Mood Indigo" and a swinging "They Can't Take That Away From Me," whose title reflects a sentiment that applies to Pass' position at the very top of the list of the world's finest jazz guitarists."

Track listing
 "Meditation (Meditação)" (Antônio Carlos Jobim, Newton Mendonça, Norman Gimbel) – 4:52
 "Shadow Waltz" (Al Dubin, Harry Warren) – 2:05
 "Mood Indigo" (Duke Ellington, Irving Mills, Barney Bigard) – 3:24
 "More Than You Know" (Vincent Youmans, Edward Eliscu, Billy Rose) – 3:52
 "When Your Lover Has Gone" (Einar A. Swan) – 6:41
 "Everything Happens to Me" (Tom Adair, Matt Dennis) – 4:41
 "It's All Right With Me" (Cole Porter) – 4:51
 "I'll Never Be The Same" (Matty Malneck, Frank Signorelli, Gus Kahn) – 4:59
 "You Stepped Out of a Dream" (Nacio Herb Brown, Gus Kahn) – 3:54
 "All the Things You Are" (Oscar Hammerstein II, Jerome Kern) – 4:06
 "How Deep Is the Ocean?" (Irving Berlin) – 6:29
 "They Can't Take That Away from Me" (George Gershwin, Ira Gershwin) – 2:42

Personnel
 Joe Pass – guitar

References

External links

Joe Pass live albums
Live albums published posthumously
2002 live albums
Pablo Records live albums